The leopard flounder  (Bothus pantherinus) or panther flounder, is a flatfish found in the Pacific and Indian Oceans.

Range
Bothus pantherinus is found in the Red Sea and Persian Gulf to South Africa, as far as southeast Australia and Japan.

Description
The eyed side shows dark spots, blotches and rings. One broader dark blotch is located on middle of the straight section of the lateral line. The male has an elongate pectoral fin which signals in courtship or territorial displays and when alarmed.

Leopard flounders use color to camouflage themselves. Bothus pantherinus takes on dull, spotted coloring to blend in with the rocky seafloor. It waits for its prey to swim by. Other times the flounder turns an almost see-through color to avoid predators when swimming near the surface.

Habitat
Leopard flounder is a benthic species living on the bottom of a sea. It inhabits sandy or silty sand, and muddy bottoms of inner reef flats.

References

External links
 

leopard flounder
Fish of the Red Sea
Fish of Hawaii
leopard flounder